Megalotragus was a genus of very large extinct African alcelaphines that occurred from the Pliocene to early Holocene. Its skull resembled that of modern hartebeests, but it differed in having a larger body size and wildebeest-like proportions. The genus consists of three species of which Megalotragus priscus survived until the early Holocene 7.500 C14yBP.

Description 
The skull of Megalotragus is similar to that of the hartebeest: characterized by extreme elongation, and the fusion and posterior placement of the horn pedicels. However, it's postcrania and proportions are largely reminiscent of wildebeest: for instance, axes from Megalotragus are robust and compact, suggesting it had a robust, muscular neck that was likely held horizontally, much like black wildebeest.

The nasal region of Megalotragus (with the exception of Megalotragus priscus) is inflated and forms a domed structure. This is similar to the related Rusingoryx (once included in Megalotragus) but not as extreme. The type species M. kattwinkeli has relatively short, curved horns. M. isaaci possessed longer horns, while M. priscus possessed the longest horns of all three species.

See also 
 Alcelaphini
 Black Wildebeest
 Hartebeest
 Wildebeest

References 

Alcelaphinae
Prehistoric bovids
Pliocene even-toed ungulates
Pleistocene even-toed ungulates
Pliocene first appearances
Pleistocene genus extinctions
Holocene extinctions
Pliocene mammals of Africa
Pleistocene mammals of Africa
Prehistoric even-toed ungulate genera
Fossil taxa described in 1932